The following is a list of notable Old Bridgnorthians, former pupils of Bridgnorth Grammar School (now Bridgnorth Endowed School) in Bridgnorth, Shropshire, England.

Army 
 General Sir Charles Warren, GCMG, KCB, FRS (1840–1927), Commissioner of the Metropolitan Police and General in the Second Boer War.

Church 
 William Bree, Archdeacon of Coventry (1887–1908)
 Rev. Robert William Eyton (1815–1881), Rector of Ryton and author of The Antiquities of Shropshire (1853–60).
 Bishop James Fraser (1818–1885), reforming Bishop of Manchester.
 Rev. Osborne Gordon (1813–83), Rector of Easthampstead and influential Oxford don.
 Bishop Thomas Percy (1729–1811), Bishop of Dromore and author of Reliques of Ancient English Poetry (1765).
Bishop Francis Henry Thicknesse (1829–1921), inaugural Suffragan Bishop of Leicester.

Medicine 
 Thomas Beddoes (1760–1808), physician and scientific writer.
 William Macmichael (1783–1839), physician to Kings George IV and William IV and author of The Gold-Headed Cane (1827)

Politics 
 Sir John Josiah Guest, 1st Baronet, MP (1785–1852), engineer, entrepreneur, and Member of Parliament.
 Ralph Lingen, 1st Baron Lingen (1819–1905), influential civil servant.
 John Lloyd (1833–1915), Welsh-born London County Councillor 
 Henry John Roby, MP (1830–1915), classical scholar, writer on Roman law, and Member of Parliament.

Science 
 Professor Peter Bullock (1937–2008), Nobel Peace Prize winning scientist who was keen for soil to be used as a sustainable resource.

Sport 
 Cyril Washbrook, CBE (1914–1999), cricketer who played for Lancashire and England.

Stage and Screen 
 Sir Cedric Hardwicke, KBE (1893–1964), Hollywood character actor.
 Ross Antony (1974–), British television personality in Germany.</ref>

References

 
Bridgnorth
Shropshire-related lists